Sir John Derek Alun-Jones  (6 June 1933 – 19 January 2008) was a British businessman and chairman of Ferranti at the time of its merger with US company  International Signal and Control (ISC).

He was educated at Lancing College and St Edmund Hall, Oxford, where he read Law.  He began his career with Philips Industrial in 1957, and became managing director of Expandite in 1966. He moved to Burmah Oil in 1971, and became a director of Burmah Oil Trading before moving to Ferranti in 1975.

Alun-Jones was appointed chairman of Ferranti in 1982 and oversaw the £420 million merger with the Pennsylvania based company International Signal & Control in 1987.  However, it soon became apparent that a subsidiary of ISC had been involved in a huge fraud which had inflated the value of ISC at the time of the merger.  Ferranti went into receivership in 1993.

He remained a director of several companies after leaving Ferranti and was chairman of the governors of Lancing College from 1986 to 1999. He was knighted in 1987.

References

http://www.telegraph.co.uk/news/obituaries/1577871/Sir-Derek-Alun-Jones.html
http://thepeerage.com/p22475.htm#i224749

1933 births
2008 deaths
Ferranti
People educated at Lancing College
Alumni of St Edmund Hall, Oxford
Knights Bachelor
Burmah-Castrol
British chairpersons of corporations
British corporate directors
Businesspeople awarded knighthoods
20th-century British businesspeople